The Keeping Hours is a 2017 American supernatural horror drama film directed by Karen Moncrieff and written by Rebecca Sonnenshine. The film stars Lee Pace, Carrie Coon and Sander Thomas. The film released on July 24, 2018, via video on demand and DVD on August 7, 2018 by Universal Pictures. Seven years after the death of their son, a divorced couple is suddenly reunited by supernatural events that offer them a chance at forgiveness.

Plot 
The movie opens with a couple preparing for a wedding at their home. Mark and Elizabeth already have a son, Jacob. After eight years they make the relationship official, exchange wedding vows, and enjoy a day long reception with family and friends. Time flashes to the future with the couple divorced after the son was killed in an automobile accident. The father was driving and the mother thinks she failed to secure the boy's seat belt. Each blame the other parent and yet themselves for the tragic death.

Mark is an attorney busy working at a large law firm. Elizabeth has remarried, wrote a book and lives in an expensive home with her step-daughters.  Mark is bothered with tenants who abandoned the rented former marital home. Mark inspects the home where lights flicker and he hears strange noises.  He hears footsteps and he finds Jacob's toys in the attic. He sees Jacob and passes out. After time and adjustment, Mark accepts Jacob's ghost as real. After Jacob asks Dad about Mommy, Mark brings Elizabeth to the home.  She sees her son and thinks Mark has played some cruel trick on her. She learns to accept reality and is happy the boy is back in their lives. Neither parent can touch the boy.

Mark quits his job to make time to be with Jacob. Elizabeth visits the house each day.  Jacob tells his parents he wants things back to normal including the couple back together loving one another. They all do things to make up for lost opportunities. Mom reads bedtime stories and Dad plays games.  Jacob wants that real train set that he never got. The couple become close again.  They learn that Jacob can leave the house so they go to the beach and build sand castles and watch a beautiful sunset.

Jacob tells Dad that he pushed the red button that released the seat belt. Jacob caused his own death and Dad should not feel guilty and he should forgive Mom.  Elizabeth has been having nose bleeds and passed out after claiming to see her deceased mother.  After an emergency room visit, Elizabeth tells Mark she stopped her depression medicine and the fainting was isolated and nothing to worry about.  When Dad gets home, Jacob has his train set up and fully running.  Jacob tells Dad that Mom has to take a long train ride with him.  Mark confronts Elizabeth and she tells him she has terminal cancer.  Mark tells her that Jacob told him that he unlatched the seat belt and she was not at fault.  Later, Jacob comes to his Mom's hospital room and she hugs him and they both disappear into a white light.

Cast 
 Lee Pace as Mark Bennett - Father
 Carrie Coon as Elizabeth Welles - Mother
 Sander Thomas as Jacob - Son
 Ray Baker as Lenn - Mark's father
 Amy Smart as Amy - Neighbor lady
 Julian Latourelle as Dash - Neighbor boy
 Ana Ortiz as Janice Trejada - Psychic medium
 Molly Hagan as Daniels - Mark's boss
 Brianne Howey as Caroline
 Anna Diop as Kate
 Jane Daly as Elizabeth's Mom
 Cliff Chamberlain as Smith - Elizabeth's new husband
 Lylah Raye Acosta as Emma - Step-daughter
 Ruby Moncrieff-Karten as Isabelle - Step-daughter

Production 
On October 14, 2015, it was announced that Karen Moncrieff would direct a supernatural romance horror film scripted by Rebecca Sonnenshine, about two parents whose life together ends when their son dies in a car accident. Lee Pace and Carrie Coon were cast in the film to play the parents, while Jason Blum would produce the film through his Blumhouse Productions.

Principal photography on the film began on December 1, 2015 in Los Angeles, which ended on January 22, 2016.

References

External links 
 
 

2010s romance films
2017 horror films
American romantic horror films
American horror thriller films
American supernatural drama films
American supernatural horror films
American supernatural thriller films
American haunted house films
American horror drama films
2017 thriller drama films
American ghost films
Films about death
Films shot in Los Angeles
Films produced by Jason Blum
Films directed by Karen Moncrieff
Blumhouse Productions films
2017 drama films
2010s English-language films
2010s American films